Nowe Kusy  is a village in the administrative district of Gmina Pasłęk, within Elbląg County, Warmian-Masurian Voivodeship, in northern Poland with a population of about 315.

References

Nowe Kusy